Mobilicoccus pelagius is a Gram-positive bacterium from the genus of Mobilicoccus which has been isolated from the gut of the fish Trachurus japonicus from Japan.

References

Micrococcales
Bacteria described in 2011